The Cambridge Pre-U is a school leaving qualification from Cambridge Assessment International Education that is an alternative to the current A Level qualification. It is principally aimed at students aged 16–19, and has recognition for university entrance.

The Cambridge Pre-U was launched in 2008 by Cambridge International Examinations in order to create a qualification which would offer additional depth in subjects beyond the standard A-Level syllabus. A number of independent, grammar and comprehensive schools and sixth-form colleges have replaced A-Levels with Cambridge Pre-Us in some subjects. A British school in Kenya switched to Pre-U, making it the first centre for these examinations outside the UK. Over 120 schools offer Cambridge Pre-U in at least some subjects and over 300 further schools have registered interest.

As there are continuous reforms with British A-levels, some schools have not only decided to offer the Cambridge Pre-U as an alternative but to switch completely to offering solely the Cambridge Pre-U (or other exams such as International A-levels, the IB etc.) to offer students a more consistent education.

The Cambridge Pre-U is linear, like the UK A level (the international A level variant delivered by Cambridge International Examinations is also linear), and does not have any compulsory principal subjects as the International Baccalaureate does: students have a free choice of three such "Principal Subjects" out of 27. Additional subjects may be taken, though not incorporated into the Diploma. There are also 'short courses', consisting of one year's study, available in Modern Foreign Languages, Maths and Further Maths. Students who complete an "Independent Research Project" and a "Global Perspectives" portfolio in addition to the three "Principal Subjects" are eligible for the award of the Cambridge Pre-U Diploma.

According to the Cambridge International Examinations website of the Cambridge Pre-U, all the 'Ivy League' universities in the USA accepted the Cambridge Pre-U for the purposes of university entrance.

Cambridge Assessment International Education plans to withdraw its Cambridge Pre-U qualification. The last examination will be in June 2023, with a resit available in June 2024.

Principal Subjects

The Guide for Schools  lists:

 English: Literature in English
 Humanities: Classical Heritage, Geography, Global Perspectives, History, Philosophy and Theology
 Languages: Classical Greek, French, German, Italian, Latin, Mandarin Chinese, Russian, Spanish
 Mathematics: Mathematics, Further Mathematics
 Science: Biology, Chemistry, Physics
 Social Sciences: Business and Management, Comparative Government and Politics, Economics, Psychology
 The Arts: Art and Design, Art History, Drama and Theatre, Music

Grading
In the Pre-U, each Principal Subject is graded on a three-band, nine-grade scale:

The full Pre-U Diploma is graded on the aggregate of the three Principal Subjects, the Independent Research Project, and the Global Perspectives portfolio. The two together (GPR) can also be taken as a separate subject. The Independent Research Project and the Global Perspectives portfolio are each worth exactly half of a Principal Subject; thus, their aggregate forms the equivalent of another Principal Subject. The Pre-U Diploma is graded out of 96 overall; each Principal Subject is graded out of 24, and both Global Perspectives and the Independent Research Report are graded out of 12 each. Some schools will do a mix of A-levels and Pre-U Principal Subjects. With such a mix it is still possible to earn a Pre-U Diploma.

UCAS tariff
The Universities and Colleges Admission Service (UCAS) has awarded a tariff score for Cambridge Pre-U which reflects the HE view of the qualification as very good preparation for university study. Using UCAS tariff scores as a benchmark, universities will be able to compare Cambridge Pre-U and A Level grades.

Unlike A Levels, the Cambridge Pre-U grading scale is divided into three bands: Distinction, Merit and Pass, each sub-divided into three grades (Distinction 1, Distinction 2, Distinction 3 and so on). The top grade, Distinction 1, reports achievement above and beyond the new A Level A* grade; Distinction 2 is aligned towards A* at A Level (earning a fractionally higher UCAS score), and Distinction 3 is aligned to the current Grade A. The lowest pass grade, Pass 3, is aligned to the border between E and U at A Level.

UCAS awards Principal Subjects 52 points for Distinction 3 and that a Pass 3 is worth 20 points. The tariff for exceptional candidates who achieve a Distinction 1 pass were to have been announced after the first Cambridge Pre-U examination entries were assessed; both D1 and D2 are currently awarded 56 tariff points.

UCAS has given the Global Perspectives and Research component the same tariff as a single Principal Subject. The 'short course' subjects have a separate tariff score too, for example: 22 for a Distinction 1; 20 for a Distinction 2 or 3; 6 for a Pass 3.

References

External links
Cambridge Pre-U official site
First Pre-U textbook (in chemistry) 
Pre-U Past Papers 

Cambridge International Examinations
Educational qualifications in the United Kingdom
School qualifications
School examinations